Mahmoud Mohammadi is an Iranian diplomat and politician.

References

 Official Biography

1953 births
Living people
Iranian diplomats
Moderation and Development Party politicians
Members of the 7th Islamic Consultative Assembly
Spokespersons for the Ministry of Foreign Affairs of Iran